The mourners' bench, also known as the mercy seat or anxious bench, in Methodist and other evangelical Christian churches is a bench located in front of the chancel. The practice was instituted by John Wesley, the founder of the Methodist Church. 

Individuals kneel at the mourners' bench to experience the New Birth. Some of those who have already had the New Birth go there to receive entire sanctification. Others, especially backsliders, use the mourners' bench to confess their sins and receive forgiveness, in order to continue the process of sanctification. 

At the mourners' bench, individuals receive spiritual counsel from a minister. In keeping with the doctrine of the mortification of the flesh, penitents do not kneel on kneeler cushions but instead kneel on the floor. 

Today many, but not all, Methodist churches supplant the mourners' bench with chancel rails, where Methodists, as well as other evangelical Christians receive Holy Communion, in addition to experiencing the New Birth, repenting of their sins, and praying.

See also 

Altar call
Conditional preservation of the saints

References

External links 
Methodist History: The Mourners' Bench

Church architecture
Methodism